Absolute Giganten is a 1999 German comedy drama film written and directed by Sebastian Schipper, produced by Stefan Arndt and Tom Tykwer. Set in Hamburg, it depicts how a group of young Germans react to the prospect of one of them leaving forever, and involves drinking, V8 engines, and an extraordinary game of table football.

It was Schipper's first movie as a director. In the year 2000 the movie won the German Film Award in the category Outstanding Feature Film.

Cast
 Frank Giering as Floyd
 Florian Lukas as Ricco
 Antoine Monot, Jr. as Walter
 Julia Hummer as Telsa
 Jochen Nickel as Snake
  as Elvis
 Guido A. Schick as Dulle
 Silvana Bosi as Walter's Grandma

Reception 
The film was generally well-received by German critics. The American film critic Eric D. Snider wrote that the film "has the sort of world-weary, melancholy bleakness we've come to expect from that country, while at the same time infusing energy and vigor into filmmaking as an art form. This is a pitifully touching film, uplifting for its intrinsic beauty even while evoking sadness for the characters."

External links

References

1999 films
1990s German-language films
1990s action comedy-drama films
German action comedy-drama films
1999 romantic comedy-drama films
German romantic comedy-drama films
Films directed by Sebastian Schipper
Films set in Hamburg
1990s German films